Innocenzo Conti (8 February 1731  – 15 November 1785) was a cardinal of the Roman Catholic Church.

In November 1769, he was appointed Apostolic Nuncio to Portugal. The next month, he was made archbishop. He was appointed by Pope Clement XIV to be a cardinal in pectore in September 1771, but this was not made public until 19 April 1773. He was not elevated to the position until 26 May 1774. He participated in the conclave of 1774–1775.

References

1731 births
1785 deaths
Clergy from Rome
18th-century Italian cardinals
Diplomats of the Holy See
Diplomats from Rome